Television in Peru has a history of more than 60 years.  There are 105 television broadcasters in Peru, 22 of which are in Lima.  In regard to television receivers, in 2003 there were 5,470,000 — that is 200 televisions for every thousand inhabitants.  The number of cable subscribers was 967,943 in 2011.

History 
The first experimental transmission of television in Peru occurred on September 21, 1939, transmitting a film and an artistic program from Nuestra Señora de Guadalupe school in Lima.  Another test transmission was made by Antonio Pereyra from the Bolivar Hotel on May 28, 1954. On January 17, 1958, the Ministry of Education and UNESCO inaugurated the State Channel 7 and conducted a test broadcast. The first commercial television broadcast was on Channel 4 Radio América in Lima, on December 15, 1958, by Nicanor González and José Antonio Umbert.  Channel 4 Radio America's creation was possible because of an agreement with NBC and RCA.

Several commercial television stations followed, including Channel 2 (Radiodifusora Victoria S.A.), Channel 13 — later changed to Channel 5 (Panamericana Televisión S.A.), Channel 9 (Compañía Peruana de Producciones Radiales y TV), Channel 11 (Bego Televisión S.A.). Many of them soon acquired — or were associated with — stations outside Metropolitan Lima.  In just two months, November and December 1959, Lima stores recorded sales of 10,000 television sets, and full-page ads in newspapers and magazines announced the start of the era of television in Peru. By April 1960, there were 55,000 television sets operating in the Peruvian capital.  The growth was explosive, considering the fact that in 1958 there were only 5,000 televisions.

Digital television 

On March 30, 2010, Peru starts digital television transition, with TV Perú being the first television station to begin broadcast digitally. The analog broadcast in Peru will be discontinued in 2020.

Television channels

Broadcast stations

Lima 
The broadcast stations in Lima are:

On VHF (Except for Channel 11, all are national chains that transmit via satellite all across the country.)
 Channel 2: Latina Televisión (Frequency, video: 55.25Mhz audio: 59.75Mhz) — For many years managed by company shareholder Baruch Ivcher, he operated many years under the protection of a judicial order because of various abuses carried out by the Winters brothers during the end of the Fujimori regime. In 2012, the company was sold to Enfoca Inversiones, a Peruvian investment group, led by CEO Jesus Zamora.
 Channel 4: América Televisión (Frequency, video: 67.25Mhz audio: 71.75Mhz) — Property of the Crousillat family, administration was passed to the creditors due to excessive debt, and is administered by a consortium led by the newspapers El Comercio and La República, despite the criticisms of the Crousillat family.
 Channel 5: Panamericana Televisión (Frequency, video: 77.25Mhz audio: 81.75Mhz)— Property of Ernesto Schutz Freundt, was delivered into receivership by entrepreneur Genaro Delgado Parker, founder of the network and a minor shareholder of the company, who controlled the network until mid-2009, at which time it was returned by judicial power to Schütz Freundt.
 Channel 7: TV Perú — Belongs to the State.
 Channel 9: ATV — Property of the Julio Vera Abad, but managed by the principal creditor Guatelmalan-Mexican businessman Remigio Ángel González through the international television consortium Albavisión.
 Channel 11: RBC Televisión — Property of entrepreneur Ricardo Belmont Cassinelli and about 70,000 partner shareholders who invested US$3M (at $1 per share) when the company was formed in 1985 and Belmont assumed distribution of profits or interest.
 Channel 13: Global TV — Created businessman Vittorio de Ferrari.  Passed to the Peruvian broadcaster Genaro Delgado Parker, but managed by its main creditor Guatemalan-Mexican businessman Remigio Ángel González through the international television consortium Albavisión.

On UHF:
 Channel 14: Catorce Televisión (It transmits sporadically and at very low power so that in almost all of Lima the signal of this channel is not tuned)
 Channel 15: La Tele — Property of Guatemalan-Mexican businessman Remigio Ángel González.
 Channel 21; ATV+ (Grupo ATV News Channel)
 Channel 23: ATV Sur (Repeater of the signal of Arequipa)
 Channel 25: Bethel Televisión
 Channel 45: Anqa TV (no longer emits signal)
 Channel 47; Kairos TV Plus (Broadcast Christian music 24 hours a day)

On TDT HD:
 Channel 16: TV Perú HD — The High Definition version of TV Peru, which can be viewed on TV with a decoder, has been operational since March 30, 2010.  It also has a replicated version of the SD analog signal and also can be viewed on cell phones due to the "One Seg" signal.
 Channel 18: ATV HD — The high definition version of ATV, with high-resolution images, was launched on March 31, 2010.  ATV móvil can be seen on cell phones through the "One Seg" signal.
 Channel 20: Latina Televisión HDTV — The high definition version of Latina Televisión started testing September 2, and officially launched on September 14, 2010.  It also has the "One Seg" signal.
 Channel 22: Global Televisión HD — Available since August 28, 2010, and also has a mobile signal.
 Channel 24: América Televisión HD — This is the digital high def version of América Televisión, on trial since July 2010. It also has the "One Seg" signal: América TV Portátil and also has an SD replicated analog signal.
 Channel 26: Panamericana Televisión HD — started broadcasting in August 2011, still in SD.
 Channel 28: La Tele HD — will start broadcasting in 2011.
 Channel 32: Perú TV HD — will start transmissions by the end of 2014.
 Channel 34: TBN-Enlace HD — in testing beginning in April 2011.
 Channel 36: Bethel Televisión HD — started transmissions in 2011.
 Channel 38: RBC Televisión HD — will start transmissions in June 2014, last chance not to lose their license.

Northern Peru 
 Televisión Chimbote - Channel 4 - Chimbote
 Antenavisión Televisión - Channel 5 - Chimbote
 Radio Televisión del Norte - RTN - Channel 7 - Ancash
 Huaraz de Radiodifusión - Huaraz
 Atenas TV - Chepén
 Antena Regional - Chota
 Antena Regional - Cutervo
 Canal UAP 45 UHF - Piura
 Antena 5 - Tumbes

Southern Peru 
 Inka Visión, Channel 31 - Cusco
 Compañía de Televisión Cusqueña, Channel 2 - Cusco
 TV Perú Austral - Cusco
 TV Mundo - Cusco
 Machu Picchu TV Channel 41 - Cusco - Property of Don Mauro Calvo Acurio and part of Corporación Machupicchu - TV UHF 41 - Radio - 1110 AM - 101.3 FM.
 Channel UNSAAC - Cusco
 Channel Universidad Andina - Cusco
 Solar TV - Cusco
 Telemar - Ilo
 Cordillerana TV - Ayacucho
 Megavisión - Juliaca
 VRTV Channel 21 Nazca
 Tele Imagen Channel 27 (Puno)

Central Peru 
 Chanka Visión - Andahuaylas
 Sur Andina - Abancay
 MegaTv Channel 43 - Huánuco
 Antena 31 Televisión - Huánuco
 Global Televisión - Huánuco
 Cable Visión - La Oroya
 Oxatel - Oxapampa
 Tarma Televisión - Tarma

Eastern Peru 
 Amazonica de Televisión, Channel 2 - Iquitos
 TeleSeis - Yurimaguas
 Cable Max - Juanjuí
 AmazoníaTV- Juanjuí
 Anas Televisión - Puerto Maldonado
 Ucayalina de Televisión, Canal 19 - Pucallpa
 Videoriente Televisión, Channel 6 - Pucallpa
 Televida - Moyobamba
 Channel E Frecuencia Educativa - Moyobamba]
 TV Cine - Moyobamba
 Selva TV - Moyobamba
 Moyobamba Televisión - Moyobamba
 Genius TV - Moyobamba
 Anteres TV - Moyobamba
 Unión TV - Moyobamba
 TV SAM - Tarapoto
 Sonora Comercial - Tarapoto

International channels 
 Perú Mágico
 Sur Perú
 Animemotion TV
 Pakita Studio Producciones Television

Peruvian cable networks 
There are three major cable providers in Peru: Movistar TV (Telefónica), DirecTV, and Claro TV (formerly Cable Express, Megacable, and Telmex TV). The following are Media Networks channels used exclusively for Movistar TV:
 Movistar Deportes (sports station, property of Media Networks - exclusively for Movistar TV)
 Movistar Plus (property of Media Networks - exclusively for Movistar TV)
 Canal N (property of Productora Peruana de Información - exclusive agreement for Movistar TV).
 Cable Visión — is a television station exclusively for cable.  The company has a presence in 16 cities across the country.  It has varied programming with its own production subsidiaries.  Cable Vision's headquarters are in Huánuco.
 FEM (property of Inhaus Producciones - exclusivity agreement with Movistar TV).
 RPP TV (belongs to Grupo RPP - exclusivity agreement with Movistar TV).
 Canal del Congreso (property of the Peruvian Congress).
 Q channel (property of Quality Products - broadcast on Movistar TV).
 Star TV Arequipa canal 4 (property of Star Globalcom - Arequipa and Tacna - Cable Star and Movistar TV).
 Claro TV (property of Claro - Lima and Chiclayo).
 Hipódromo de Monterrico (JCP TV) (limited hours - broadcast on Movistar TV and for the vendors of the Jockey Club of Peru).
 Willax Televisión (available on Claro TV and on Movistar TV).

Defunct channels 
 Uranio TV Channel 15
 Austral Televisión Channel 11
 Cable Canal de Noticias
 Cable Mágico Noticias
 Cable Mágico Cultural
 Antena Informativa
 Visión 20
 Monitor
 OK TV Channel 11
 Ovación TV Channel 57
 UNITEL Channel 27
 Cubo TV Channel 33
 Bego TV Channel 11
 Teledos Channel 2
 Victoria TV Channel 2
 TV El Sol Channel 9
 Panamericana Teleeducacion Channel 13
 Canal A Channel 11 later 23
 Canal Familiar Channel 11
 Stereo33 Channel 33
 Univision Channel 13 (no relations to the one in the United States)
América Next (Global TV entered in its replacement)

Most viewed channels

See also
 Media of Peru

References